1 Litre of Tears may refer to:
 1 Litre no Namida, a 1986 book by Aya Kitō
 1 Litre no Namida (TV series), a 2005 Japanese television drama based on the book
 A Litre of Tears (film), a 2004 film based on the book